Amolatar District is a district in Northern Uganda. Like many other Ugandan districts, it is named after its main municipal and administrative centre, Amolatar Town.

Location
Amolatar District is bordered by Apac District to the north, Dokolo District to the northeast, Kaberamaido District to the east, Buyende District to the southeast, Kayunga District to the south and Nakasongola District to the west. The coordinates of the district are:01 38N, 32 50E.

Overview
Amolatar District was formed in 2005, when it was carved out of Lira District. The district is part of the Lango sub-region, together with the other seven districts listed below. The constituent districts of the Lango sub-region are:
 Amolatar District
 Alebtong District
 Apac District
 Dokolo District
 Kole District
 Lira District
 Oyam District
 Otuke District

The district contains 346 villages, organized into 33 parishes. Administratively, the district is divided into the five administrative units:
 Amolatar Town Council
 Muntu Sub-county: 
 Awelo Sub-county, Etam Town Council, Namasale Town Council 
 Namasale Sub-county 
 Aputi Sub-county .

The district is known for the Amolatar Monument which marks the geographic centre of Uganda.

Population
The 1991 national population census estimated the district population at about 68,500. The 2002 national census estimated the population of the district at approximately 96,200. The district population is growing at an estimated annual rate of 2.9%, between 2002 and 2012. It is estimated that the population of the district in 2012 was about 127,400.

Economic activities
Subsistence agriculture, animal husbandry and commercial fishing from area lakes constitute the economic engine of the district. Crops grown include:

Livestock raised in the district includes: cattle, goats, chicken and turkeys.

See also

References

External links
 Amolatar: Uganda Within Uganda

 
Lango sub-region
Districts of Uganda
Northern Region, Uganda
Lake Kyoga